Bright November Morning is the fourth solo studio album by New Zealand musician Don McGlashan. Released in February 2022, the album debuted at number one on the Official New Zealand Music Chart.

Production

The album was recorded and produced by Don McGlashan & The Others, a band which included McGlashan, James Duncan on bass and keyboards, Chris O'Connor on drums and Shayne P. Carter as the band's guitarist. In addition, musicians Hollie Smith and The Beths featured on the album. Due to the effects of the COVID-19 pandemic in New Zealand, McGlashan found himself breaking old habits.

The song "Lights Come On" was inspired by McGlashan's early days with the Mutton Birds, while "Sunscreen" is an ode to New Zealand summers. "John Bryce" was inspired by New Zealand politician John Bryce and the government attack on Parihaka in November 1881.

Release and promotion

The album was preceded by three singles, "Now's the Place" in September 2021, "Go Back In" in November, and "All the Goodbyes in the World" in February 2022. When Bright November Morning was released in February 2022, it became McGlashan's first number one album in New Zealand.

Track listing

Credits and personnel

The Beths – backing vocals (2)
Shayne P. Carter – backing vocals, lead guitar
Chris Chetland – mastering
Anita Clark – violin (9)
Chris Close – recording assistant at Sitting Room
James Duncan – backing vocals, bass, keyboards
Ben Edwards – recording
Jarrod Edwards – recording assistant at NoiseFloor
Emily Fairlight – backing vocals (10)
Bob Frisbee – recording
Elmore Jones – recording assistant at Sitting Room
Don McGlashan – guitar, keyboards, tenor horn, vocals
Don McGlashan & the Others – performer, producer
Chris O'Connor – backing vocals, drums, percussion
Hollie Smith – backing vocals (2)
Luke Tomes – mixing

Charts

Release history

References

2022 albums
Don McGlashan albums